Obosomase is a town in the Akuapim South Municipal District of the Eastern Region of south Ghana. It shares borders with Ahwerase and Tutu Akuapem

Notable places 

 Obosomase Waterfalls

References 

Populated places in the Eastern Region (Ghana)